iQOO is a Chinese consumer electronics manufacturer headquartered in Dongguan, Guangdong. The company was founded on 30 January 2019 as a subsidiary of the consumer electronics manufacturer Vivo based in the same city.

History 
In March 2019, the world's second largest smartphone manufacturer, BBK Electronics, announced iQOO as a sub-brand of Vivo as its newest member to its smartphone brand lineup along with Oppo, Vivo, Realme and OnePlus. The brand was introduced in India in February 2020. The iQOO is also a performance focused sub-brand giving more importance to build and market their phones specifically for gaming and other performance intense tasks, rather than their Vivo phones focusing mainly on camera and sound quality. The smartphone iQOO 3 introduced on 25 February 2020 is their first smartphone with Snapdragon 865 giving a competitive advantage for gamers. The smartphones are sold online initially. .

During 2020–2021, the iQOO introduced six smartphones in the Chinese market and three smartphones in the Indian market, as of May 2021.

 iQOO U3 with MediaTek Dimensity 800U processor
 iQOO U1x with Snapdragon 662 processor and 5000 mAh battery
 iQOO Neo3 with Snapdragon 865 processor and 144 Hz refresh rate display
 iQOO 5 with Snapdragon 865 processor and 55 W fast charging
 iQOO 7 with latest Snapdragon 870 processor and 66 W fast charging
 IQOO 9pro, launched in 2022 with the latest Snapdragon 8 Gen 1 (2022) processor, 1500 nits of brightness and 120w fast charging.
 iQOO 11 launched in 10 January 2023 with the latest Snapdragon 8 Gen 2 processor, and 120 W Fast Charging

Products

Smartphones

iQOO 3 5G 
iQOO 3 is a 5G smartphone launched in 2020 with Snapdragon 865 processor and iQOO UI 1.0 based on Android 10. The phone has a Super AMOLED display with support for HDR10+ and Corning Gorilla Glass 6. It has an aluminium frame with a glass back, and has UFS 3.1 for storage. It comes with a quad camera on the rear equipped with a 48mp primary senor capable of recording at 4K@30/60fps. It has support for WiFi 6 and has an indisplay fingerprint scanner. It supports 55w fast charging capable of charging the 4400 mAh to 50% in 15 minutes.

iQOO series

iQOO Z series

iQOO U series

iQOO Pro series

iQOO Neo series

Custom UI 
While introducing iQOO 3, along with it iQOO UI 1.0 is also introduced as its custom UI of iQOO on top of Android 10 for its smartphone lineup with customisable 'Always on' display and gaming focus features.

Notes

References 

BBK Electronics
Chinese brands
Electronics companies of China
Mobile phone companies of China
Mobile phone manufacturers